Andrew Herr (born May 25, 1991) is a Canadian actor from London, Ontario. He is best known for his starring role as Jonesy on Letterkenny.

Early life 
Herr was born in London, Ontario, but his family eventually moved to St. George, Ontario. He grew up playing ice hockey, but his dreams of playing the sport professionally faded over the years. He later said that his time playing hockey had an impact on his acting career and that growing up, he knew hockey players who were similar to the character he eventually went on to play in Letterkenny. When Herr was going into his final year of high school, his father got a new job, and his family had to move to Kingston, Ontario, where he attended Regiopolis-Notre Dame Catholic Secondary School (from which he graduated). Among other activities he picked up in his new high school, he decided to try out for a role in a local production of Daniel MacIvor's play "Never Swim Alone," to be performed at the Sears Drama Festival. It was through this play that he found his passion for acting.

College and career 
Herr sought to pursue a career in acting, and he was accepted to the theater program at Toronto Metropolitan University (then called "Ryerson University"). However, he instead chose to move to Vancouver to attend the University of British Columbia (UBC), where after a year, he would have the opportunity to audition for their prestigious theater program. He was not chosen for the program. While at UBC, Herr became roommates with Dylan Playfair, with whom he appeared in the television movie Mr. Hockey: The Gordie Howe Story. The two of them would eventually co-star as best friends in Letterkenny. After his first year at UBC, Herr took a year off to attend the Vancouver Media Arts Institute; he auditioned for the "Mr. Hockey" biopic after that.

While living in Vancouver, Herr joined a men's league hockey team, where he met Jared Keeso. Keeso cast Herr and Playfair as the "hockey players" in the series of web skits he was creating, "Letterkenny Problems." This series eventually was picked up by Crave and became the show "Letterkenny."

Filmography

Film

Television

References

External links 

 

Canadian male film actors
Canadian male television actors
Living people
21st-century Canadian male actors
Male actors from Ontario
1991 births